Felix Israel Domeno Konotey-Ahulu FGA, FRCPSG, FRCP, FWACP (born 12 July 1930) is a Ghanaian physician and scientist who is Kwegyir Aggrey Distinguished Professor of Human Genetics at the University of Cape Coast, Ghana, and a consultant physician/genetic counsellor, Haemoglobinopathy/Sickle Cell States, in Harley Street, London. He is one of the world's foremost experts on sickle-cell disease.

Education 
Felix Israel Domeno Konotey-Ahulu was born in Odumase-Krobo, Gold Coast (now Ghana). He attended the Basel/Presbyterian Mission Schools, and at Achimota School (1947–49) took the Cambridge School Certificate (Grade I) and the London Matriculation (1st Division), subsequently going to University College of the Gold Coast (1951–53). He went on to London University where he read medicine (University College London and Westminster Hospital School of Medicine). He graduated with MB BS, Membership of the Royal College of Surgeons, LRCP in 1959.

After full registration in the UK he joined the Ghana Civil Service as Medical Officer, with subsequent postings at the University of Ghana Medical School and the Ministry of Health at Korle Bu Teaching Hospital, where he directed the largest sickle-cell disease clinic in the world. Post-graduate studies took him to Liverpool School of Tropical Medicine, Westminster Hospital, Royal Postgraduate Medical School, Hammersmith, and Professor (later Dame) Sheila Sherlock's Department of Medicine at the Royal Free Hospital, London, where he was Research Fellow.

Early career 
He went back to Ghana to Korle-Bu Teaching Hospital and University of Ghana Medical School as Lecturer, then Senior Lecturer. He researched into Clinical Haemoglobinopathy and, together with Professors Bela Ringelhann (Hungary), Hermann Lehmann (University of Cambridge), and others he discovered Haemoglobin Korle-Bu and Haemoglobin Osu-Christiansborg. He was Physician Specialist at Korle-Bu Hospital and Ridge Hospital, Accra, and Director of the erstwhile Ghana Institute of Clinical Genetics.

In 1972 he was National Foundation/March of Dimes Visiting Lecturer to 11 American Medical Schools, including Yale Medical School, George Washington University Medical School, Howard University College of Medicine, Cornell, Rockefeller, Indianapolis, Tennessee and Johns Hopkins.

He was Andrew N. Schofield Fellow, Christ's College, Cambridge (1970–71), and in 1976 he gave Edinburgh University’s MacArthur Postgraduate Lecture. Konotey-Ahulu has lectured in Turkey, Brazil, Greece, Singapore, Australia, India, Hungary, Canada, Denmark, Switzerland, Sweden (Stockholm) and, on the African continent, in Ghana, Nigeria, Cameroon, Ivory Coast, Sierra Leone, Liberia, Senegal, Kenya, Tanzania, Zambia, South Africa and Egypt. He did Grand Rounds at the NIH (Bethesda), George Washington University, Johns Hopkins, Howard University, Illinois and Chicago universities, and in Cook County Hospital, Chicago.

He was once editor of the Ghana Medical Journal, chairman of a Ghanaian Government Committee to Investigate Hospital Fees, member of the WHO Expert Committee Advisory Panel on Human Genetics, and a temporary consultant to the Commonwealth Secretariat’s Medical Department in London. In March 1980, he was the University of Ghana Alumni Lecturer on the subject "Genes and Society, and Society and Genes". Professor Roland Scott invited him as Annual Visiting Professor to Howard University College of Medicine, and as Honorary Consultant to its Centre for Sickle Cell Disease, Washington DC.

Honours and awards 
 Konotey-Ahulu was one of the recipients of the Dr Martin Luther King Jr. Foundation Award "for outstanding research in Sickle Cell Anaemia" (other recipients included Roland B Scott, Linus Pauling (Nobel Prize-winner), Herman Lehmann, Bela Ringelhann, James E. Bowman, Max Perutz (Nobel Prize-winner), J. V. Neel, Charles Whitten, and Graham Serjeant, in Philadelphia 1972, when Konotey-Ahulu was chosen to give the keynote address).
 In 1974 he was awarded the Gold Medal of the Ghana Academy of Arts and Sciences of which he was a Fellow (FGA), for "the most outstanding contribution to knowledge in the Medical Sciences by a Ghanaian between 1952 and 1973".
 In 1976 in London he received the Guinness Award for Scientific Achievement (GASA) in the Commonwealth "in recognition of his work in applying science to the service of the community".
 In November 1999, he received from President Abdou Diouf of Senegal the 1998 Third World Academy of Sciences Award for outstanding work in the Basic Medical Sciences. The citation of this Trieste-based TWAS Award noted not only his "outstanding contributions to haemoglobinopathy" but also his "first description of some 5 new physical signs in Clinical Medicine, invention of the 'Male Procreative Superiority Index' (MPSI) which shed some light on aspects of African Anthropogenetics, and for his insistence on an ethical dimension to genetic programmes, and highlighting public health measures as the best tool for long-term sickle-cell patient management."

Reading in New African (August/September 2004) that he was voted among "The One Hundred Greatest Africans Of All Time", he promptly pleaded in the October issue that he be replaced by Aggrey of Africa, whom he proved by a 1,600-word article to be altogether more worthy of such honour. In September 2005, he gave five consecutive public lectures at the British Council Accra, on Contemporary Health Issues, in commemoration of the 115th anniversary of the Scripture Union in Ghana.

African health research 
In March 1998, Konotey-Ahulu was appointed Chief Visiting Clinician/Scientist, Kenya Medical Research Institute (KEMRI), and he is on the editorial board of the African Journal of Health Sciences of The African Forum of Health Sciences. Between 1965 and 2005 he published more than 200 articles, letters, editorials, book reviews, and comments. He has been round Sub-Saharan African countries studying AIDS, and has published What is AIDS? (227 pages), The Sickle Cell Disease Patient (643 pages), and one booklet, Sickle Cell Disease – The Case For Family Planning (32 pages). Ghana's Managing Trustees of the VALCO Trust Fund supported much of his research. Konotey-Ahulu is a former examiner at the University of Ghana Medical School. In April 2000, he was appointed "Dr Kwegyir Aggrey Distinguished Professor of Human Genetics, University of Cape Coast, Ghana" after having been awarded an honorary DSc degree. His inaugural lecture was titled "Human Genetics and the Ghanaian African: How The New Genetics Affects You". In 2000 he was elected Fellow of the Third World Academy of Sciences.

In June 1973 he was invited to join The World Council of Churches' Consultation on Genetics and Quality of Life, chaired by Dr Robert Edwards, and more than 30 years later he is still in contact with Bob Edwards through the Ethics Committee of the Cromwell Hospital, London, where Konotey-Ahulu was Consultant Physician from 1983 to July 2005. To present the African viewpoint in an International Symposium on "The Human Genome Diversity Project", published by Politics and The Life Sciences (PLS), Lake Superior State University, USA, in September 1999 he titled his paper "The Human Genome Diversity Project: Cogitations of an African Native" (pages 317–322), where he traced the sickle-cell gene in his ancestry, with patients' names, generation by generation back to AD 1670, aided by the fact that the hereditary rheumatic syndrome was known to African tribes by specific onomatopoeic names for centuries before it was first described in the US in 1910.

This exercise in genetic genealogy, rare in medical archives, helped Konotey-Ahulu develop a discipline of genetic epidemiology to show how polygamy in his forebears produced gene combinations with variations in phenotypic expression of the hereditary syndrome. His invention of the Male Procreative Superiority Index (MPSI), which shed new light on African anthropogenetics, is the result of this personalised genetic epidemiology.

In October 2002, the South African Medical Research Council, with Georgetown University, Washington DC, invited him to take part in an International Conference on "Developing Sustainable Health Care Delivery Systems in Africa for the New Millennium". He spoke on two topics: "An African Physician's Personal Analysis of his Continent's Sustainable Health Care Delivery Prognosis for the New Millennium", and "Setting Priorities and Overcoming Obstacles: AIDS in Africa – Obstacles to Health Care Delivery".

Linguistics 
Konotey-Ahulu has recently developed a method for writing African tonal languages, explained in a book titled Mother Tongue – Introducing The Tadka Phonation Technique For Speaking An African Tonal Language: Krobo/Dangme-Ga of South-East Ghana (82 pages – . T-A’D Co Watford, UK, 2001). The book aims to help educate some Africans to read their own language more easily and quickly than has hitherto been possible. It will also explain the basic principles of Public Health information about genetic and acquired disease to those who do not read English, and promises to be a great tool in adult education. If it proved helpful, the book would be translated into French and Portuguese.

Christianity 
Professor Konotey-Ahulu is a Christian, plays the piano, and has written a Millennium Hymn of seven verses, complete with melody, entitled "Time Was Created", which the University of Cape Coast Choir sang after his inaugural address.
He is a staunch biblical creationist, and has ably defended Christianity in the Ghanaian Times and the British Medical Journal. His faith also means that he is strongly anti-abortion, and has denounced genetic testing for sickle-cell disease with a view to aborting babies with the disease. Most recently, he has answered the latest antitheistic arguments from Richard Dawkins and the racist arguments from James Watson.

Career and accomplishments 
The value of Professor Konotey-Ahulu's work as a global authority on sickle-cell disease, including some discoveries in Clinical Medicine, has been widely recognized by medical practitioners and specialists around the world, leading to his inclusion in a survey of "The 100 Greatest Africans of All Time". He has produced more than 200 publications, a number of which have become the definitive studies in their field.

Professor Konotey-Ahulu is the first person known to have traced hereditary disease in his forebears, generation by generation, with all names, right back to 1670 AD. He is the recipient of numerous awards including the Dr. Martin Luther King Jr. Foundation Award for outstanding research in Sickle Cell Anaemia, the Guinness Award for Scientific Achievement in the Commonwealth, and the Gold Medal of the Ghana Academy of Arts and Sciences for outstanding contribution to knowledge in the Medical Sciences by a Ghanaian.

References

External links 
 http://www.sicklecell.md

Living people
University of Ghana alumni
Alumni of the University of London
Academic staff of the University of Cape Coast
Academic staff of the University of Ghana Medical School
Ghanaian scientists
Alumni of Achimota School
1930 births
Place of birth missing (living people)
Ghanaian geneticists
Fellows of the Ghana Academy of Arts and Sciences